Hvítavatn is a small lake in the southern Highlands of Iceland. It is situated between Sídujökull and Skeiðarájökull, two of the southern arms of the big glacier Vatnajökull, and lies 15 km to the north of the infamous Skeiðará sander.

There are some lakes and rivers with the adjective hvíta (meaning white) in their name in Iceland. This comes from the origin of most of the freshwater on this island: the glaciers.

See also
List of lakes of Iceland

Lakes of Iceland